Herpyllis of Stagira was Aristotle's concubine after his wife, Pythias, died. 

Together Aristotle and Herpyllis had a son, named Nicomachus after Aristotle's father.  Nicomachus was quite young when Aristotle wrote his will, as can be seen from the fact that Nicanor, Aristotle's nephew by his sister Arimneste, was appointed guardian until Nicomachus came of age.

References
Diogenes Laërtius, Life of Aristotle. Translated by C.D. Yonge.
 Eduard Zeller, Aristotle and the Earlier Peripatetics (1897).

4th-century BC Greek women
Aristotle
Ancient Stagirites
4th-century BC Greek people